Collinz Room is an American Rock band from Los Angeles, CA.  Collinz Room was formed in 2002 and currently is working on a new cd, expected to be released in 2012.

Biography
Formed in 2002 out of Los Angeles California, Collinz Room takes center stage in the world of straight up rock, fine tuned with alternative, and not without that punch of punk. Their style is described as "a blend of raw rock with a soulful edge" by James James of Speak EZ radio and "a flavored addiction that begs for more" by Shawn Plunkett of Flare Magazine. Collinz Room is known for their dulcet vocals well balanced with a tenacious range of beats and riffs.

Achievements
Collinz Room has released three albums: “Vampire Puppet”,“Silence the Insects” and "Cymatic Paper Trails". In 2010 the single “Just Another Day” won them their second LA Music Award after being featured on a Saw IV soundtrack. All three albums are available through digital retailers worldwide. They have been seen playing venues such as MTV's Campus Courtyard, Tide Fest, and most recently in the 2011 Warped Tour.

Members
The band members Rick Amieva, vocals; Lew Nottke, guitar; Kris Campbell, bass; and Luis Campos “Chocs”, drummer, known for their catchy tunes and eclectic style, They continue to impress the music industry and fans alike as the next up-and-coming band bringing together the elements of unforgettable music together with an explosive live show. Past member includes Jonny Whitton on the lead guitar and Jay Mcneal on the bass guitar

References

Indie rock musical groups from California
Musical groups from Los Angeles